Charles, Charlie, Charley, or Chuck Hayes may refer to:

Arts and entertainment
 Charles G. Hayes (1937–2014), American musician
 Charles Geoffrey Hayes (1942–2018), English television presenter and actor, better known as Geoffrey Hayes
 Walker Hayes (Charles Edgar Walker Hayes, born 1979), American singer

Sports
 Charley Hayes, American baseball player
 Charlie Hayes (born 1965), baseball player
 Chuck Hayes (born 1983), American basketball player

Others
 Charles Hayes (mathematician) (1678–1760), English mathematician
 Charles R. Hayes (1899–1968), Justice of the South Dakota Supreme Court
 Charles H. Hayes (1906–1995), 8th Assistant Commandant of the Marine Corps
 Charles Hayes (politician) (1918–1997), U.S. Representative from Illinois

See also
 Charles Hays (1834–1879), U.S. Representative from Alabama
 Charles Melville Hays (1856–1912), American railroad tycoon who died in the sinking of the RMS Titanic
 Charles Hay (disambiguation)